The Japanese manga series GetBackers was written by Yuya Aoki and illustrated by Rando Ayamine. The series was published by Kodansha in the Weekly Shōnen Magazine from 1999 to 2007. The plot of the manga follows the "GetBackers", a group that retrieves anything that was lost. The team is primarily composed by Ban Mido, a man with the ability of 200 kilograms-force in his right hand and an illusionary technique called the "Evil Eye". The other member, Ginji Amano is the former leader of a gang called "The VOLTS", a powerful group in the dangerous territory called the Infinity Fortress, and has the ability to control electricity.

The manga consists of 39 tankōbon  containing twelve story arcs with the name of "Act" and a short number of side stories named "Interlude". The first tankōbon was released on August 17, 1999, and the last one was released on April 17, 2007. In February 2009, Kodansha published a one-shot chapter from the series in their Magazine Special journal. The manga series was also adapted into a forty-nine episode anime series by Studio Deen. The anime series, which premiered on Tokyo Broadcasting System (TBS) on October 5, 2002 and ended on September 20, 2003.

GetBackers is licensed for an English language release in North America by Tokyopop, who first announced it in the Anime Expo 2004 in July 2003. Tokyo Pop divided it into two series: GetBackers featuring the first twenty-five and GetBackers: Infinity Fortress the following ones. GetBackers was published from February 10, 2004, to July 7, 2008. However, only the first three volumes of Infinity Fortress were released. On August 31, 2009, Tokyopop announced that they would not be completing the series as their licenses with Kodansha expired and Kodansha required that they immediately stop publication of all previously licensed series, including GetBackers. Because of this, the series is now considered to be out-of-print.

Volumes

GetBackers

GetBackers: Infinity Fortress

References 
 

Specific

GetBackers
GetBackers